Mary Thomson may refer to:
Mary King (equestrian) (née Thomson, born 1961), British Olympic equestrian sportswoman
David and Mary Thomson Collegiate Institute

See also
Mary Thompson (disambiguation)
Thomson (disambiguation)